Weinmannia tinctoria is a species of plant in the family Cunoniaceae. It is found in Mauritius and Réunion off the east coast of Africa.

Conservation
It is an IUCN Red List Critically endangered species, threatened by habitat loss. In Mauritius, the population is estimated to be less than 50 individuals.

References

tinctoria
Flora of Mauritius
Flora of Réunion
Critically endangered flora of Africa
Taxonomy articles created by Polbot